Günter Strack (4 June 1929 – 18 January 1999) was a German film and television actor.

Career
 
In English language films, he played Professor Karl Manfred in the Hitchcock thriller Torn Curtain (1966) and appeared as Kunik in The Odessa File (1974). In Germany, he was known for his roles in the crime series Ein Fall für zwei and the family series Diese Drombuschs.

Death
He died from heart failure. His wife Lore died in 2014 at the age of 77.

Selected filmography

External links

Fan Site 
Short Biography 
 

1929 births
1999 deaths
German male film actors
German male television actors
Officers Crosses of the Order of Merit of the Federal Republic of Germany
Actors from Darmstadt
20th-century German male actors